Chinook is a census-designated place (CDP) in Pacific County, Washington, United States. The population was 457 at the 2000 census and increased to 466 at the 2010 census.

History
Chinook was the site of the first court in Pacific County in 1853, as well as the county's first salmon cannery in 1870.

Chinook was once a wealthy town based on the salmon harvest.  There was no road connection to Ilwaco until 1891, when the bridge was completed across the Chinook River.  Later, the Ilwaco Railway and Navigation Company built a narrow gauge railroad from Megler to Ilwaco, passing down the main street of Chinook.  The railroad was dismantled in 1931.

Geography
According to the United States Census Bureau, the CDP has a total area of 1.0 square miles (2.6 km2), all of it land. The town is located on Baker Bay, on the north side of the Columbia River just behind Cape Disappointment and the mouth of the Columbia.

Demographics
As of the census of 2000, there were 457 people, 210 households, and 137 families residing in the CDP. The population density was 446.8 people per square mile (173.0/km2). There were 263 housing units at an average density of 257.1/sq mi (99.6/km2). The racial makeup of the CDP was 96.50% White, 0.88% Native American, 0.66% Asian, 0.22% from other races, and 1.75% from two or more races. Hispanic or Latino of any race were 1.97% of the population. 21.2% were of German, 14.9% Irish, 9.1% European, 7.7% French, 7.4% American, 6.9% English, 6.9% Swedish and 6.1% French Canadian ancestry according to Census 2000.

There were 210 households, out of which 20.5% had children under the age of 18 living with them, 56.7% were married couples living together, 6.7% had a female householder with no husband present, and 34.3% were non-families. 31.0% of all households were made up of individuals, and 11.9% had someone living alone who was 65 years of age or older. The average household size was 2.18 and the average family size was 2.71.

In the CDP, the population was spread out, with 19.3% under the age of 18, 4.4% from 18 to 24, 20.6% from 25 to 44, 32.6% from 45 to 64, and 23.2% who were 65 years of age or older. The median age was 48 years. For every 100 females, there were 95.3 males. For every 100 females age 18 and over, there were 93.2 males.

The median income for a household in the CDP was $30,417, and the median income for a family was $40,000. Males had a median income of $40,568 versus $20,625 for females. The per capita income for the CDP was $17,198. About 13.2% of families and 18.2% of the population were below the poverty line, including 40.8% of those under age 18 and none of those age 65 or over.

References

External links

Washington (state) populated places on the Columbia River
Census-designated places in Pacific County, Washington
Census-designated places in Washington (state)